Tom Pedi (September 14, 1913 – December 29, 1996) was an American actor whose work included roles on stage, television and film in a career spanning 50 years. He was particularly well-known for his portrayal of Rocky, the night barman, in The Iceman Cometh, a part which he originated and played on stage, film and television.

Pedi was the cousin of voice actress Christine Pedi.

He is buried in Loma Vista Memorial Park in Fullerton, California.

Performances

Theater 
All listings come from the Internet Broadway Database.

Pedi also performed in the premier of the stage version of State Fair at The Muny in St. Louis in 1969. The show had a two week run.

Film
All listings come from the Internet Movie Database.

Television
All listings come from the Internet Movie Database.

References

External links
 
 
 

1913 births
1996 deaths
20th-century American male actors
American male film actors
American male stage actors
American male television actors
Male actors from New York City